Iota Alpha Pi was an international collegiate sorority operating in the United States and Canada from March 3, 1903 to July 1971, when it ceased operations.

History
Iota Alpha Pi was the first national sorority for Jewish women. On March 3, 1903, on the campus of New York City, Normal College (now Hunter College), seven young women created a new sorority which they called the J.A.P. club,, or "Jay-ay-peez", focused on religious education and settlement house work.

The founders were:

Frances Zellermayer was a sister to Zeta Beta Tau founder Maurice Zellermayer and later married the brother of her fellow founder Rose Delson.

In 1913, with the new name Iota Alpha Pi, the members began the traditional sorority expansion process. The original organizers grouped themselves as Alpha chapter and the succeeding group became Beta chapter. Early expansion was at other schools in the New York Area, Gamma at the Brooklyn Law School, Delta at NYU Washington Square and Epsilon at the New Jersey Law School  The Sorority became international in 1929 with the founding of Kappa chapter at University of Toronto,  University of Manitoba had a particularly prosperous chapter.

In 1924, a Rotation Scholarship Fund was created, allowing money to be loaned to worthy students by the sorority on the expectation of it being repaid. In 1925 the sorority began creating its own semi-annual bulletin.

Iota joined the National Panhellenic Conference as an associate member in November 1953 and became a full member on November 4, 1957. Although many chapters were planned, Iota Alpha Pi could not keep up with its rapidly growing competitors.

Historian Marianne Sanua recounts the life of Iota Alpha Pi in her book, Going Greek: Jewish College Fraternities in the United States, 1895-1945. The sorority was "not for the especially popular, affluent, or snobbish, but just a group of good friends" (p. 81) The American Jewish Yearbook 5692 describes the sorority as Jewish in a positive way". This accolade probably stems from Iota's studies on women in the Bible.

By 1966, Iota Alpha Pi had granted a total 23 charters. A report by Wilson Heller indicates that the sorority was strong until 1968. Heller posits that the sorority saw dramatic declines in membership, particularly with the cessation of the "Christians only" clause in non-Jewish organizations.

As of June 1, 1967 an NPC report indicated that Iota Alpha Pi had 11 chapters , 8 Alumnae groups and 5,802 sisters and 13 chapters, 8 Alumnae groups and 6,204 as of June 1, 1969.

In 1969, Iota Alpha Pi established new chapters at the University of Maryland College Park and Hunter College Park Avenue.

In July 1971, the international headquarters voted to disband Iota Alpha Pi (Heller).

Two chapters went on to affiliate into other national sororities.  The Beta Alpha chapter at Penn State joined Alpha Epsilon Phi, while the Upsilon chapter at Rider University eventually affiliated with Delta Phi Epsilon.

As of 2008, some alumni continue to hold reunions and other events. However, no formal organization exists to coordinate these gatherings.

Insignia
The original name of the sorority was J.A.P. Their publication was The J.A.P. Bulletin. With the name change to Iota Alpha Pi, the magazine was also renamed: The Heights.

The first official badge was a scarlet horizontal diamond surrounded by seed pearls. Later versions of the badge included two full blown roses at the points of the diamond.

Official colors:red and black.

As of 1931, the sorority used in " a diamond of scarlet surrounded by jewels" where a crest would otherwise be used.

National Philanthropy: Muscular Dystrophy

Chapters
Chapters of Iota Alpha Pi include the following.  All are inactive, thus noted by italics.

The Baird's Archive notes a 1969 colony as a separate chapter from Alpha and Beta at Hunter College, Park Avenue, but this group did not charter. This appears to be an error, and should be clarified as simply an attempt to reestablish itself on the sorority's first campus.

Conventions
Conventions include:

Notable Alumnae
Jill Wine-Banks - one of the prosecutors during the Watergate scandal. She was the first woman to serve as US General Counsel of the Army (1977–80)

See also
 List of Jewish fraternities and sororities

Notes

References

Defunct former members of the National Panhellenic Conference
1903 establishments in New York City
Organizations disestablished in 1971
Student organizations established in 1903
1971 disestablishments in the United States
Historically Jewish sororities in the United States
Jewish organizations established in 1903